Calosoma affine is a species of ground beetle in the subfamily of Carabinae. It was described by Maximilien Chaudoir in 1843.

References

affine
Beetles described in 1843